Eretis umbra, commonly known as the small marbled elf, is a species of butterfly in the family Hesperiidae. It is found from South Africa to eastern Africa and Uganda. Similar to Eretis djaelaelae but lacks white forelegs.

The wingspan is 30–32 mm for males and 32–37 mm for females. Adults are on wing year-round in warmer areas and from August to May in cooler areas.

The larvae feed on Chaetacanthus setiger, Phaulopsis, Dyschoriste, Chaetacanthus (synonym of Dyschoriste), Justicia and Asystasia (including Asystasia schimperi).

Subspecies
Eretis umbra umbra - South Africa: along the coast from the western Cape to the eastern Cape, Eswatini, KwaZulu-Natal, the Orange Free State, Limpopo, the North-West Provinces, Mpumalanga, Gauteng and the eastern part of the northern Cape
Eretis umbra maculifera Mabille & Boullet, 1916 - north-eastern Uganda, central and western Kenya, Tanzania
Eretis umbra nox (Neave, 1910) - Malawi, southern and eastern Zambia, Mozambique, Zimbabwe

References

Butterflies described in 1862
Celaenorrhinini